Joseph Lagrosillière (2 November 1872 - 6 January 1950) was a French lawyer and politician. He was mayor of Sainte-Marie from 1910 to 1936 and deputy of Martinique from 1910 to 1924 and from 1932 to 1942. He was also president of the General Council of Martinique from 1935 to 1937 and from 1945 to 1946. Lagrosillière was the founder of the socialist movement in Martinique and one of the most important political figures on the island during the first half of the 20th century.

Biography 
He went to France to study law at the colonial school of the Faculty of Law in Paris. While there he befriended Jules Guesde and became active in the West Indies socialist group in Paris from 1896. Lagrosillière was called to the bar in Paris and Tunis on 29 June 1898. He was admitted to the Fort-de-France bar on his return to the Martinique in 1901. The same year, he created the first Socialist Federation of Martinique. Then he founded the newspaper , of which he was also the editor-in-chief.

Joseph Lagrosillière was a candidate for the legislative elections in the northern constituency in 1902, but because of the eruption of Mount Pelée on 8 May, the second round scheduled for 11 May did not take place. He lost a large part of his family in the disaster. Devastated, he moved to Saint Pierre and Miquelon for two years. He was elected deputy in the North in 1910 and re-elected in 1914. He was elected mayor of Sainte-Marie and remained the town's chief magistrate for 26 years.

In 1913, considering himself insulted in a newspaper article, Lagrosillière challenged the procurer general of Martinique, Jules Liontel, to a duel. A court of honour found Liontel too old to accept, but his son insisted that he substitute for his father. The contest was held on 5 February; the younger Liontel lost to Lagrosillière.  In a disagreement with the metropolitan socialist deputies on the issue of assimilation, he resigned from the socialist group in the Chamber of Deputies that July. A fierce supporter of assimilation, Lagrosillière, together with the Guadeloupean deputy Achille René-Boisneuf, presented a bill to reform the Constitution of Guadeloupe, Martinique and Réunion in 1914, which would have transformed the colonies into departments of France.

In 1919, he made a political alliance with Fernand Clerc, leader of the progressive factory owners, at the "" for the following legislative elections against his opponent Sévère, who was allied with the conservative Békés. He was elected as a deputy in the South for the next five years. The same year, he became president of the General Council, which he presided over until 1939. He was imprisoned after the municipal elections and the strike of 1925 for inciting unrest and violence.

Joseph Lagrosillière was arrested in 1931 for "" (a type of corruption) and imprisoned in Le Havre, France. Despite his legal troubles, he was re-elected as a deputy in the South of Martinique in 1932, during this term, he established the ""; Paulette Nardal was his parliamentary assistant and press officer. He remained deputy of Martinique until the outbreak of the Second World War in France. Joseph Lagrosillière fought his last political battle in the 1945 municipal elections in Fort-de-France, where he was beaten by more than 5000 votes by the young communist candidate, Aimé Césaire.

Joseph Lagrosillière died on the 6th January 1950, at the age of 77.

Political career 

 1910 to 1936: Mayor of Sainte-Marie
 1935 to 1937; 1945 to 1946: President of the General Council of Martinique
 1910 to 1924 and from 1932 to 1940: Deputy of Martinique

Publications 
1900s founded and ran the newspaper 

1903 , 1903

1908 

1900s founded and ran the newspaper  with Amédée Knight;

1930s 

1938

Sources 

 Joseph Lagrosillière, socialiste colonial, biography in 3 volumes written by Camille Darsières, éditions Désormeaux, 1999 - Volume 1 : "Les années pures, 1872-1919", Volume 2 : "Les années dures, 1920-1931", Tome 3 : "La remontée, 1932-1950".

References 

French Section of the Workers' International politicians
Members of the 16th Chamber of Deputies of the French Third Republic
Members of the 15th Chamber of Deputies of the French Third Republic
Members of the 12th Chamber of Deputies of the French Third Republic
Members of the 11th Chamber of Deputies of the French Third Republic
Members of the 10th Chamber of Deputies of the French Third Republic
Deaths in Paris
1872 births
1950 deaths
People from Sainte-Marie, Martinique
Martiniquais lawyers
Martiniquais politicians
French duellists